Sakruli is a village in Punjab, India.

It is located in the Hoshiarpur district of Punjab state.

Geography 
The latitude 31.3271903 and longitude 76.0225084 are the geocoordinate of the Sakruli. Chandigarh is the state capital for Sakruli village. It is located around 96.6 kilometer away from Sakruli.. The other nearest state capital from Sakruli is Chandigarh and its distance is 96.6 km. 

The other surrounding state capitals are Chandigarh (96.6 km), Shimla (110.8 km)., Dehradun (230.5 km).

Time 
It is located in the UTC 5.30 time zone and it follows Indian standard time (IST). The sun rise time varies 26 minutes from IST. The vehicle driving side in Sakruli is left, all vehicles should take left side during driving. Sakruli people are using its national currency which is Indian Rupee and its international currency code is INR. 

Mobile phones can be accessed by adding the Indian country dialing code +91 from abroad. Sakruli people are following the dd/mm/yyyy date format in day-to-day life. Sakruli domain name extension( country code top-level domain (cTLD)) is .in

Official language 
The native language of Sakruli is Punjabi and most of the village people speak Punjabi. Sakruli people use Punjabi language for communication.

Nearest railway station 
The nearest railway station to Sakruli is Mahngarwal Doaba which is located in and around 6.5 kilometer distance. 

The following table shows other railway stations and its distance: 

 Mahngarwal Doaba railway station	6.5 km.
 Satnaur Badesron railway station	10.6 km.
 Garhshankar railway station	15.9 km. Khatkar Kalan railway station	18.1 km.
 Hoshiarpur railway station	24.6 km.

Nearest airport 

 Sakruli's nearest airport is Sahnewal Airport situated at 53.3 km distance. 
 Few more airports around Sakruli are as follows.
 Sahnewal Airport	53.3 km.
 Halwara Air Force Station	74.4 km.
 Gaggal Airport	96.0 km.

Nearest districts 
Sakruli is located around 25.0 kilometer away from its district headquarter hoshiarpur. 

The other nearest district headquarters is nawanshahr situated at 24.1 km distance from Sakruli .

Surrounding districts 
Shahid_Bhagat_Singh_Nagar (nawanshahr ) district	24.1 km.

 Una ( una ) district	28.4 km.
 Rupnagar ( rupnagar ) district	61.1 km.
 Kapurthala ( kapurthala ) district	61.3 km

Nearest town/city 
Nearest town/city/important place is Mahilpur located at the distance of 3.8 kilometer. 

Villages in Hoshiarpur district